The TI-1031 was a 4 function calculator manufactured by Texas Instruments. Introduced in 1981 at a price of $12, the calculator had a liquid-crystal display, weighed 1.9 ounces, and contained 24 keys.

References

Texas Instruments calculators